Agnes Lauchlan (10 February 1905 – 28 August 1993) was a British stage, film and television actress.

Agnes Mary Lauchlan, was born on 10 February 1905 in Putney, London, to Henry D. Lauchlan, a surgeon, and his Scottish-born wife Minnie. She trained at RADA, and made her stage debut in 1924. Lauchlan married William Connelly in Surrey in 1948. She died in Surrey on 28 August 1993.

Selected filmography
 The Compulsory Wife (1937)
 Oh, Mr Porter! (1937)
 Alf's Button Afloat (1938)
 The Spy in Black (1939)
 Me and My Pal (1939)
 The Young Mr. Pitt (1942)
 This Man Is Mine (1946)
 Once Upon a Dream (1949)
 Time Is My Enemy (1954)

References

 Death GRO Index: CONNELY, Agnes Mary.  Surrey South Western, September 1993, DoB:10 February 1905, District No:  7613A Reg No:  A7E  Ent No:  082 DOR:  0993

External links
 
 Agnes Lauchlan Obituary in The Independent

1905 births
1993 deaths
People from Putney
British stage actresses
British film actresses
British television actresses
20th-century British actresses
Alumni of RADA
20th-century British businesspeople